New Mathematics or New Math was a dramatic but temporary change in the way mathematics was taught in American grade schools, and to a lesser extent in European countries and elsewhere, during the 1950s1970s. Curriculum topics and teaching practices were changed in the U.S. shortly after the Sputnik crisis.  The goal was to boost students' science education and mathematical skills to compete with Soviet engineers, reputedly highly skilled mathematicians.

Overview 

After the Sputnik launch in 1957, the U.S. National Science Foundation funded the development of several new curricula in the sciences, such as the Physical Science Study Committee high school physics curriculum, Biological Sciences Curriculum Study in biology, and CHEM Study in chemistry.  Several mathematics curriculum development efforts were also funded as part of the same initiative, such as the Madison Project, School Mathematics Study Group, and University of Illinois Committee on School Mathematics.

These curricula were quite different from one another, yet shared the idea that children's learning of arithmetic algorithms would last past the exam only if memorization and practice were paired with teaching for understanding.  More specifically, elementary school arithmetic beyond single digits makes sense only on the basis of understanding place value.  This goal was the reason for teaching arithmetic in bases other than ten in the New Math, despite critics' derision: In that unfamiliar context, students couldn't just mindlessly follow an algorithm, but had to think why the place value of the "hundreds" digit in base seven is 49.  Keeping track of non-decimal notation also explains the need to distinguish numbers (values) from the numerals that represent them, a distinction some critics considered fetishistic.

Topics introduced in the New Math include set theory, modular arithmetic, algebraic inequalities, bases other than 10, matrices, symbolic logic, Boolean algebra, and abstract algebra.

All of the New Math projects emphasized some form of discovery learning. Students worked in groups to invent theories about problems posed in the textbooks.  Materials for teachers described the classroom as "noisy."  Part of the job of the teacher was to move from table to table assessing the theory that each group of students had developed and "torpedoing" wrong theories by providing counterexamples.  For that style of teaching to be tolerable for students, they had to experience the teacher as a colleague rather than as an adversary or as someone concerned mainly with grading.  New Math workshops for teachers, therefore, spent as much effort on the pedagogy as on the mathematics.

Criticism 
Parents and teachers who opposed the New Math in the U.S. complained that the new curriculum was too far outside of students' ordinary experience and was not worth taking time away from more traditional topics, such as arithmetic. The material also put new demands on teachers, many of whom were required to teach material they did not fully understand. Parents were concerned that they did not understand what their children were learning and could not help them with their studies. In an effort to learn the material, many parents attended their children's classes. In the end, it was concluded that the experiment was not working, and New Math fell out of favor before the end of the 1960s, though it continued to be taught for years thereafter in some school districts.

In the Algebra preface of his book, Precalculus Mathematics in a Nutshell, Professor George F. Simmons wrote that the New Math produced students who had "heard of the commutative law, but did not know the multiplication table".

In 1965, physicist Richard Feynman wrote in the essay, New Textbooks for the "New" Mathematics:

In his book Why Johnny Can't Add: The Failure of the New Math (1973), Morris Kline says that certain advocates of the new topics "ignored completely the fact that mathematics is a cumulative development and that it is practically impossible to learn the newer creations, if one does not know the older ones". Furthermore, noting the trend to abstraction in New Math, Kline says "abstraction is not the first stage, but the last stage, in a mathematical development".

As a result of this controversy, and despite the ongoing influence of the New Math, the phrase "new math" is often used now to describe any short-lived fad that quickly becomes discredited. In 1999, Time placed it on a list of the 100 worst ideas of the 20th century.

In other countries 
In the broader context, reform of school mathematics curricula was also pursued in European countries, such as the United Kingdom (particularly by the School Mathematics Project), and France due to concerns that mathematics as taught in schools was becoming too disconnected from mathematics research, in particular that of the Bourbaki group. In West Germany the changes were seen as part of a larger process of Bildungsreform. Beyond the use of set theory and different approach to arithmetic, characteristic changes were transformation geometry in place of the traditional deductive Euclidean geometry, and an approach to calculus that was based on greater insight, rather than emphasis on facility.

Again, the changes were met with a mixed reception, but for different reasons. For example, the end-users of mathematics studies were at that time mostly in the physical sciences and engineering; and they expected manipulative skill in calculus, rather than more abstract ideas. Some compromises have since been required, given that discrete mathematics is the basic language of computing.

Teaching in the USSR did not experience such extreme upheavals, while being kept in tune, both with the applications and academic trends: 

In Japan, New Math was supported by the Ministry of Education, Culture, Sports, Science and Technology (MEXT), but not without encountering problems, leading to student-centred approaches.

In popular culture 
 Musician and university mathematics lecturer Tom Lehrer wrote a satirical song named "New Math" (from his 1965 album That Was the Year That Was), which revolved around the process of subtracting 173 from 342 in decimal and octal. The song is in the style of a lecture about the general concept of subtraction in arbitrary number systems, illustrated by two simple calculations, and highlights the New Math's emphasis on insight and abstract concepts – as Lehrer put it with an indeterminable amount of seriousness, "In the new approach ... the important thing is to understand what you're doing, rather than to get the right answer." At one point in the song, he notes that "you've got thirteen and you take away seven, and that leaves five... well, six, actually, but the idea is the important thing." The chorus pokes fun at parents' frustration and confusion over the entire method: "Hooray for New Math, New Math / It won't do you a bit of good to review math / It's so simple, so very simple / That only a child can do it."
 In 1965, cartoonist Charles Schulz authored a series of Peanuts strips, which detailed kindergartener Sally's frustrations with New Math. In the first strip, she is depicted puzzling over "sets, one-to-one matching, equivalent sets, non-equivalent sets, sets of one, sets of two, renaming two, subsets, joining sets, number sentences, placeholders." Eventually, she bursts into tears and exclaims, "All I want to know is, how much is two and two?" This series of strips was later adapted for the 1973 Peanuts animated special There's No Time for Love, Charlie Brown.  Schulz also drew a one-panel illustration of Charlie Brown at his school desk exclaiming, "How can you do 'New Math' problems with an 'Old Math' mind?"
 In the 1966 Hazel episode "A Little Bit of Genius", the show tackles the division that the introduction of New Math wrought between families, friends, and neighbors, as well as its impact on the then ever-widening generation gap.
 The 2018 film Incredibles 2 shows Bob Parr/Mr. Incredible struggling to teach his son math, frustrated by the new methods students are expected to use.

See also

 Common core
 André Lichnerowicz – Created 1967 French Lichnerowicz Commission
 Comprehensive School Mathematics Program (CSMP)
 Secondary School Mathematics Curriculum Improvement Study (SSMCIS)
 School Mathematics Project: UK version in use 1960s–1980s
 List of abandoned education methods
 School Mathematics Study Group (SMSG)
 New New Math – a satirical term for the Math Wars of the 1990s

References

Further reading
Ralph A. Raimi (1995). Whatever Happened to the New Math?

 This work was originally published as Bourbaki: une société secrète de mathématiciens (2002, in French) and the 2006 English-language version was translated by Anna Pierrehumbert.

External links
 Tom Lehrer Deposit #10

Mathematics education
Education reform